Karen Farley (born 2 September 1970) is an English former women's international footballer.

Club career
In 1995 and 1996 Farley was playing her club football in Sweden. In 2000, she was still playing for Hammarby.

International career
Farley represented England at senior level, playing in England's first ever World Cup finals appearance in 1995 which ended with a 3–0 quarter final defeat against Germany.

International goals
Scores and results list England's goal tally first.

References

1970 births
Living people
English women's footballers
England women's international footballers
Millwall Lionesses L.F.C. players
1995 FIFA Women's World Cup players
English expatriate women's footballers
Tyresö FF players
Hammarby Fotboll (women) players
Expatriate women's footballers in Sweden
English expatriate sportspeople in Sweden
Women's association football forwards
Damallsvenskan players
Lindsdals IF players